Cayambe or Volcán Cayambe is a volcano in Ecuador, in the Cordillera Central, a range of the Ecuadorian Andes.

Cayambe, which has a permanent snow cap, is a Holocene compound volcano which last erupted in March 1786. At , its south slope is the highest point in the world crossed by the Equator, and the only point on the Equator with snow cover. The volcano and most of its slopes are within the Cayambe Coca Ecological Reserve.

Cayambe was first climbed by British adventurer Edward Whymper and his two Italian guides and companions Jean-Antoine Carrel and Louis Carrel in 1880. They made first ascents of most of the volcanoes in Ecuador. Cayambe remains a favorite of mountaineers today. The main route runs through a much-fissured terrain of moderate inclination, and only in its final part does the slope increase to 45°. On the final stages, there are many cracks and seracs to be overcome, and there are extensive views from the summit.

Cayambe was considered especially beautiful by Alexander von Humboldt, whose writings in turn inspired Frederic Edwin Church to paint the peak, setting the stage for his painting The Heart of the Andes.

Cayambe's peak is the point of Earth's surface farthest from its axis; thus, it rotates the fastest as Earth spins.

See also

Lists of volcanoes
List of volcanoes in Ecuador

References

Cayambe, Instituto Geofísico de la Escuela Politécnica Nacional

External links

Cayambe: Etymology
Climbing Trip Report

Stratovolcanoes of Ecuador
Geography of Pichincha Province
Andean Volcanic Belt
Complex volcanoes
Subduction volcanoes
Glaciers of Ecuador
Five-thousanders of the Andes